Frank Nigro (born  February 11, 1960) is a Canadian-born Italian former professional ice hockey player who played 68 games in the National Hockey League with the Toronto Maple Leafs between 1982 and 1984. In the latter stages of his playing career, he joined Merano and later HC Varese of Italy's Serie A hockey league. He also competed in the men's tournament at the 1992 Winter Olympics for Italy. As a youth, he played in the 1973 Quebec International Pee-Wee Hockey Tournament with a minor ice hockey team from Richmond Hill.

Career statistics

Regular season and playoffs

International

References

External links
 

1960 births
Living people
Canadian expatriate ice hockey players in Italy
Canadian people of Italian descent
Canadian ice hockey centres
Cincinnati Tigers players
Bolzano HC players
HC Gardena players
HC Merano players
HC Varese players
Ice hockey people from Ontario
Ice hockey players at the 1992 Winter Olympics
London Knights players
New Brunswick Hawks players
Olympic ice hockey players of Italy
Peterborough Petes (ice hockey) players
Sportspeople from Richmond Hill, Ontario
St. Catharines Saints players
Toronto Maple Leafs draft picks
Toronto Maple Leafs players
Naturalised citizens of Italy
Italian ice hockey centres
Canadian expatriate ice hockey players in the United States